The Men's 3 m Springboard competition of the 2018 European Aquatics Championships was held on 9 August 2018.

Results
The preliminary round was started at 09:30. The final was held at 15:00.

Green denotes finalists

References

Men's 3 m springboard